Paul Andrew Richter (born October 28, 1966) is an American actor, comedian, screenwriter, and talk show announcer. He is best known as the sidekick for Conan O'Brien on each of O'Brien's talk shows: Late Night and The Tonight Show on NBC and Conan on TBS. He was also star of the TV series Andy Richter Controls the Universe. He voiced Mort in the Madagascar film franchise and Ben Higgenbottom in the Nickelodeon animated television series The Mighty B!.

Early life
Richter, the second of four children, was born in Grand Rapids, Michigan, to mother Glenda Swanson (née Palmer), a kitchen cabinet designer, and father Laurence R. Richter, who taught Russian at Indiana University for more than 32 years. Richter was raised in Yorkville, Illinois. He graduated from Yorkville High School in 1984, where he was elected Prom King. His parents divorced when he was 4 and his father later came out as gay. He is of Swedish-German descent.

Career

In the late 1980s, Richter attended the University of Illinois at Urbana–Champaign and Columbia College Chicago as a film major. While at Columbia, he learned the basics of comedic acting and writing by starring in numerous student films and videos. After leaving Columbia in 1988, Richter worked as a production assistant on commercial shoots in Chicago. In 1989, he began taking classes at Chicago's Improv Olympic. He went from student to "House Performer" within a year. Richter branched out working with "The Comedy Underground" and the Annoyance Theatre. Richter wrote for the short-lived Jonathan Brandmeier television show.

In the early 1990s, the Annoyance Theatre hit gold when producer Joey Soloway staged The Real Live Brady Bunch with live, word-for-word performances of the '70s sitcom. The show was so popular that it attracted national attention and moved to New York City. Richter was not an original member of the cast but the actor who played "Mike Brady" in the Chicago cast opted not to go to New York. Richter asked Soloway if he could play "Mike" in New York and, since Soloway had not cast a replacement, he agreed.

Late Night with Conan O'Brien
At the same time The Real Live Brady Bunch was playing in New York, two fellow Annoyance members (Beth Cahill and Melanie Hutsell, who played Marcia and Jan Brady in the "Real Live Brady Bunch" stage show) were hired as cast members on Saturday Night Live. With friends on SNL, Richter attended after-show parties, where he met SNL writer Robert Smigel. Two years later, Smigel hired Richter as a writer for a new show he was producing, Late Night with Conan O'Brien. Smigel sent Richter to join Conan O'Brien on stage during a practice run-through when the production staff was testing lighting angles and sound, and noticed the two had a strong rapport. He became O'Brien's sidekick just weeks before the show began airing in 1993.

Richter departed from Late Night after the show on May 26, 2000. He later said of the decision, "After seven years of being on the show, I got itchy. I have a philosophy that if you enjoy good fortune, rather than sit there and say, "Oh, that's fine, this amount is good enough for me," you should try and push it. You should see how much you can stretch your good fortune. And I was curious."

After Late Night
Richter left his post at Late Night in 2000 to pursue a career acting in films and television. His first major venture, Fox's Andy Richter Controls the Universe, was canceled after two mid-season runs. His next Fox sitcom, Quintuplets, lasted one season. His 2007 television series, Andy Barker P.I., was co-written and executive produced by Conan O'Brien. In the series, Richter played an accountant who could not attract clients. After a woman comes to his office thinking he is the former tenant, a private investigator, she asks him to find her husband, who she thinks faked his death. Barker decides to pursue this job and becomes a private detective in earnest, and continues to do his accounting job, which seems to pick up as the series goes on. The series aired on NBC, with all six episodes in the first season on NBC.com. The series was canceled after very poor ratings, despite being named by Entertainment Weekly as one of the Top Ten Shows of 2007.

The Tonight Show
On February 24, 2009, it was announced that Richter would rejoin O'Brien as the announcer for The Tonight Show with Conan O'Brien in Los Angeles. Richter frequently appeared in comedy sketches on the show and often commented and interacted with Conan during the opening monologue; he was also part of the show's writing staff. In mid-December 2009, Richter also began joining Conan on the couch during the celebrity interviews, much like he did in his former sidekick role on Late Night. Richter said he enjoyed having a steady paycheck again and not having to deal with production companies while developing television shows. Richter said, "Now I'm so happy to be back and making TV every night, not asking permission from somebody and waiting six months to get their sparklingly clear and cogent notes. And then wait another month for them to get back from Hawaii and say, 'Yes, now we can go make television.' I felt like a plumber who kept going into the building and saying, 'Can we put some pipes together?' and watching my wrenches gather dust."

Conan
When Conan O'Brien returned to the air as host of Conan on TBS in 2010, Richter followed and resumed his roles as announcer, writer, general sidekick and participant in comedy sketches.

The Three Questions with Andy Richter

Since June 2019, Richter has his own podcast on the Earwolf network.

Game shows
In 2010, Richter was considered to be a potential host of the classic Pyramid game show that was being developed for CBS, but was ultimately not picked up by the network. Had the series been picked up, it would not have affected Richter's role on Conan. On May 18, 2011, TBS announced development of a possible new version of Pyramid, again to be hosted by Richter.

In June 2010, Richter hosted the Team Coco Presents the Conan Writers Live comedy special for TBS at the Just for Laughs festival in Chicago. He hosted in place of O'Brien, who was prohibited from hosting any television program until fall 2010.

In July 2013, Richter signed up to host a game show called Step Up, which was ordered by Fox.

Richter holds the record for all-time highest one-day score on Celebrity Jeopardy!, winning $68,000 during a first-round game of the 2009–10 season's "Jeopardy! Million Dollar Celebrity Invitational". His earnings were donated to the St. Jude Children's Research Hospital.

In January 2017, he began hosting the ABC game show Big Fan.

In September 2022, Richter appeared on the series premiere of Celebrity Jeopardy!. He got 2nd place and $30,000 for his charity The Los Angeles Regional Food Bank.

Other television appearances
In April 2002, Richter appeared in the Fox series Malcolm in the Middle. In "Clip Show", he played a psychiatrist giving therapy to Malcolm, Reese, and Dewey.

In October 2005, Richter appeared in the NBC sitcom Will & Grace. In "The Old Man and the Sea", he played an annoying blind date that was teased and misled by Grace Adler, who only dated him to prove she was not a snob.

Richter appeared in Monk as a murderer posing as Adrian Monk's best friend in the episode "Mr Monk Makes a Friend".

Richter appears in the Fox series Arrested Development in the 2006 episode "S.O.B.s." He plays every member of a fictional group of identical Richter quintuplets: Donnie, Chareth, Rocky, Emmett, and himself. He reprises the roles in several episodes of season 4, which aired in 2013 on Netflix.

From 2006 to 2008, Richter had a recurring role as "Sad Dad" Stan in the TV show The New Adventures of Old Christine.

He also provided the voice of Ben on the animated series The Mighty B!, played Simon Cristini on True Jackson, VP, and reprises the voice of Mort on The Penguins of Madagascar and All Hail King Julien.

Film
In addition to his television work, Richter has appeared in motion pictures such as Aliens in the Attic, Big Trouble, Elf, Seeing Other People, New York Minute, Dr. Dolittle 2, Madagascar, Madagascar: Escape 2 Africa, Madagascar 3: Europe's Most Wanted, My Boss's Daughter, Scary Movie 2, Frank McKlusky, C.I., Pootie Tang, Talladega Nights: The Ballad of Ricky Bobby, Blades of Glory, Semi-Pro, Lenny the Wonder Dog, Dr. T & the Women and Cabin Boy.

Other appearances
In 2008, Richter appeared in composer Marc Shaiman's satirical mini-musical called "Prop 8 — The Musical". The three-minute video was distributed on the internet at FunnyOrDie.com. In addition to Richter, the cast includes Jack Black, John C. Reilly, Craig Robinson, and many other celebrities, directed by Adam Shankman. The video won the 2009 Webby Award category Comedy: Individual Short or Episode, and won a GLAAD media award.

In July 2009, Richter played for the American League as a first baseman in the 2009 Taco Bell All-Star Legends and Celebrity Softball Game. Representing the Los Angeles Angels of Anaheim, Richter hit a home run in the game.

After the end of The Tonight Show with Conan O'Brien, Richter joined O'Brien on his Legally Prohibited from Being Funny on Television Tour, a stage show touring the United States and Canada over the spring of 2010. Richter served in his usual role as announcer and sidekick. Due to performing with O'Brien, Richter was forced to drop out of the Jeopardy! Million Dollar Celebrity Invitational, in which he was a semifinalist. Isaac Mizrahi replaced Richter in the tournament. Richter also made an appearance on the Disney Channel sitcom The Suite Life on Deck as a non-religious hooded brother, Brother Theodore in the episode "Silent Treatment".

In May 2021 Richter appeared on the Gus and Eddy Podcast hosted by comedy duo Gus Johnson and Eddy Burback.

Personal life
Richter was married to comedic actress and author Sarah Thyre from 1994 to 2019, and they have two children, a son born in 2000 and a daughter born in 2005. Thyre was part of the cast of the comedy series Strangers with Candy, on which Richter made frequent cameo appearances. Richter and Thyre also appeared together playing Hansel and Gretel in an episode of the Upright Citizens Brigade sketch comedy series on Comedy Central in 1998. On April 13, 2019, Richter announced on his Twitter account that he and Thyre had separated and had begun divorce proceedings. In November 2022 he announced his engagement to Jennifer Herrera. 

Richter is a supporter of Planned Parenthood. At a fundraiser in 2016, he referenced abortion services provided in 1992 for Thyre when the couple had split and were each undergoing great personal difficulties. He stated that although they were very sad about the situation, they both knew it was the right decision for them. He also said that he is "eternally grateful" to the organization for allowing them to care for themselves and also for the ability to choose the time to bring children into their lives. The couple had been married 22 years at the time of his statements.

Richter is a member of the Sigma Phi Epsilon fraternity. After leaving Late Night with Conan O'Brien, he moved to Los Angeles.

On April 15, 2019, Richter joined other writers in firing their agents as part of the WGA's stand against the ATA and against packaging, which they believed to be an unfair practice.

Filmography

Film

Television

Video games

References

External links
 
 
 
 The Three Questions with Andy Richter

1966 births
Living people
American male comedians
American male film actors
American male television actors
American male television writers
American male voice actors
American podcasters
American people of German descent
American people of Swedish descent
American television personalities
Male television personalities
American television writers
California Democrats
Columbia College Chicago alumni
Comedians from Illinois
Comedians from Michigan
Illinois Democrats
Male actors from Grand Rapids, Michigan
Michigan Democrats
People from Yorkville, Illinois
Radio and television announcers
Screenwriters from Michigan
Screenwriters from Illinois
20th-century American comedians
21st-century American comedians
20th-century American male actors
21st-century American male actors